Richard Clive Cooper (December 31, 1881 – March 10, 1940) was  an Irish-Canadian soldier and Unionist politician. Cooper served in the First Matabele War and the Boer War. In 1914 he was assigned to serve overseas as a Major in the 7th Battalion, 1st Division, Canadian Expeditionary Force. Cooper represented Vancouver South in the House of Commons from 1917 to 1921.

References

External links
 

1940 deaths
1881 births
Members of the House of Commons of Canada from British Columbia
Unionist Party (Canada) MPs
People of the First Matabele War
Canadian Expeditionary Force officers
Military personnel from Dublin (city)
Canadian Militia officers